The Manhattan Guardian is a DC Comics costumed hero. Created by Grant Morrison and Cameron Stewart, based on the character The Guardian, he first appeared in The Manhattan Guardian #1 (2005) which was part of the Seven Soldiers of Victory "megaseries".

Publication history
The character originally appeared in the Manhattan Guardian mini-series. The inspiration came from the British newspaper The Guardian which gave Morrison the idea for a tabloid-sponsored superhero, translated to America.

The Manhattan Guardian series is set in "Cinderella City" (to separate it from the ugly sisters Metropolis and Gotham) which is New York City but with unrealised architectural projects including an idea for the Hotel Attraction proposed by Paul Laffoley, Hans Hollein's "Rolls-Royce Building" concept for 28 Liberty Street, Robert Moses' Mid-Manhattan Expressway and Frank Lloyd Wright's "Ellis Island Key". The original idea came from Paul Laffoley's suggestion to reference Gaudi's architecture for inspiration in rebuilding Ground Zero. Morrison said: "I want it to be a more exalted New York, where things that were dreamed of were finally brought into reality".

The character later made cameos in Infinite Crisis and 52.

Fictional character biography

Seven Soldiers

Jake Jordan was an unemployed and disgraced former police officer, who left the force after killing a young boy he misidentified as the murderer of his partner. On the suggestion of his fiancee's father Larry, Jake applied for a mysterious job at the Manhattan Guardian tabloid newspaper. After facing several trials disguised as a terrorist attack, including fighting a Golem, Jordan was confronted by the paper's owner, Ed Stargard. Impressed with his conduct, Ed offered Jake the job: to be the newspaper's very own Superhero/Reporter. During his meeting with Jake, Ed notes that he had bought the rights to the Guardian name from Project Cadmus, who had sponsored the original.

Shortly afterwards, Jake's fiancee Carla was kidnapped by subway pirates, and her rescue becomes his first mission. He is assisted by the newspaper's delivery boys, who have developed an information network. The pirates are rampaging through New York's underground in an effort to find a tattoo-based map. During the battle, Carla's father is killed. Shortly after the battle, Carla breaks up with Jake. Later, the Guardian faces down killer robots modeled after the world's ethnic groups. Fed up with how his new job has changed his life, Jake storms Ed's office, intent on quitting, only to find Ed is an elderly man who never physically developed beyond babyhood. Ed explains that he used to be a member of a group called the Newsboy Army known as Baby Brain. The group had a deadly and maddening encounter with the evil faerie-folk, the Sheeda, who are now storming the Guardian building, intent on finishing the former Newsboy off. Not content to leave Ed to die, the Guardian, Baby Brain, and his secretary set off to find Carla and fight the Sheeda.

With the assistance of other heroes, such as Mr. Miracle and the new Bullet-Woman, the Sheeda are defeated, and Jake and Carla are tearfully reunited, making up in the process, shown in a headline proclaiming "HERO GETS GIRL!".

Infinite Crisis

Following Seven Soldiers of Victory, Jake Jordan has been seen valiantly fighting Doomsday in the Villains United Infinite Crisis Special. He is seen in the related seven-part limited series, Infinite Crisis. Jake, along with many other superpeople, attend a mass for fallen and missing superheroes. He is one of the hundreds of defenders in the "Battle for Metropolis", protecting the city from a climactic attack from dozens of members of the "Secret Society of Supervillains".

52 and beyond

Jake's association with the heroes does not end there. Jake is seen attending the memorial service for Superboy, despite having only become the Manhattan Guardian a short time prior to the young hero's death. In week 50 of the 52 maxi-series, Jake is one of the dozens of heroes called up to the border of China to battle the maddened, rampaging Black Adam. This fight is also detailed in a tie-in series.

Superman writer James Robinson expressed a desire to have Jake team up with the original Guardian at some point in the near future.

After Eclipso destroys the moon during a battle with the Justice League, Jake is seen helping evacuate citizens from the streets of Manhattan as the city descends into chaos. The moon is repaired with effort by many of Earth's magic-based heroes.

Jake teams up with Supergirl to combat a virus-based attack on the citizens of Metropolis.

Powers and abilities
The Manhattan Guardian has no superpowers but he's a skilled hand-to-hand combatant in excellent physical condition, having been trained in the police force. Like the original Guardian, he wears a golden helmet and carries a golden shield as a weapon.

Other versions

Earth-23
Manhattan Guardian appeared as a member of the Justice League of Earth-23. He's later seen again as the entire League examines a robotic threat from beyond known time and space.

Notes

References

External links
 Morrison's 7 Soldiers: The Guardian, Comicon, September 7, 2005
 Seven Soldiers: Manhattan Guardian annotations at Barbelith

Comics characters introduced in 2005
DC Comics titles
African-American superheroes
Fictional characters from New York City
Fictional reporters
Fictional police officers in comics
Fictional shield fighters
Characters created by Grant Morrison